Photinus indictus is a species of firefly in the beetle family Lampyridae. It is found in North America.

References

Further reading

 
 

Lampyridae
Bioluminescent insects
Articles created by Qbugbot
Beetles described in 1881